Edgar Mosa (born 1986, Lisbon, Portugal) is a Portuguese-born American jewelry designer and visual artist. Mosa's work has been featured internationally at the Racine Art Museum, Racine, Wisconsin, Center for Art in Wood, Philadelphia, Pennsylvania, and The Stedelijk Museum, Amsterdam, Netherlands. In 2022, Mosa and his partner Joe McShea, installed Flags, Paris 2022, a site-specific installation for Loewe's Fall/Winter 2022 collection.

Early life and education 
Mosa was born in Lisbon, Portugal in 1986. He trained as a goldsmith from an early age. He received his Bachelor of Design at the Gerrit Rietveld Academy and a MFA at Cranbrook Academy of Art.

Work 
Mosa exhibited jewelry and metal work in 2011 at Gallery Louise Smit in Amsterdam.

In 2014, Mosa wrote an essay, titled A Look Into The Work Of Jean Paul Gaultier: Gender Amalgamation And The Musing Of The Maker for the exhibitionThe Fashion World of Jean Paul Gaultier: From the Sidewalk to the Catwalk at The Brooklyn Museum. Mosa collaborated with Hotel Particulier, a boutique gallery space, in Paris, France.

Mosa had a solo exhibition called Indentations at Jewelers’ Werk in 2017. Later that year, Mosa showed at Chamber gallery's group exhibition, Domestic Appeal, curated by Matylda Krzykowski. He exhibited Inverted Dart Game, an interactive game where players throw cork balls onto spikes further blurring the lines between craft, utility, playfulness, and decoration signature to his practice.

For Jonathan Anderson's Fall/Winter 2022 Loewe Menswear collection, Mosa collaborated with husband and artistic partner Joe McShea to install over 87 flag multi-colored flags atop sandy ground for the runway show. The artist were inspired by Baroque frescoes at the 13th-century Palazzo Monti, in Brescia, Italy, during their time as artists-in-residence. The flags have been on rotating display at various locations in Spain and New York and will be fixed to Loewe stores internationally throughout 2022.

References

Living people
1986 births
Portuguese artists
Queer artists
21st-century American jewellers
Gerrit Rietveld Academie alumni
Cranbrook Academy of Art alumni